WWAT-CD, virtual channel 45 (UHF digital channel 29), is a low-power television station licensed to Charleroi, Pennsylvania. As of April 2015, it was off the air for financial reasons.

History
WWAT-CD was owned by Benjamin Perez of Abacus Television until it was sold, along with four other TV stations, to Fifth Street Enterprises LLC in April 2015.

Construction permit
As of April 2015, WWAT-CD held a construction permit to convert to digital and raise its power to 558 watts. The station was licensed for digital operation on May 21, 2015

References

External links

WWAT-CD
Low-power television stations in the United States